The Hair is a 1974 Finnish erotic dark comedy thriller film written, produced and directed by Seppo Huunonen. It was loosely based on Lionel White's 1962 suspense novel Obsession, like Jean-Luc Godard's 1965 French film Pierrot le Fou. It tells the story of a middle-aged man who becomes deeply involved with the affairs and criminal connections of a mysterious girl. The main roles are played by Mikko Majanlahti and dancer Arja Virtanen, of which The Hair was the actress's only film. Virtanen's voice has been replaced by the voice of actress Tiia Louste.

The Hair has generally been called "the worst Finnish film ever made". It was one of the films that premiered in a year known as the trough of Finnish film production, being one of the least viewed Finnish films ever. In addition, it is also the second Finnish film, after Teuvo Tulio's Sensuela, that was rated 18 by the Finnish Board of Film Classification.

Critics were scathing in their reviews about the film. Eeva Järvenpää from Helsingin Sanomat summed up her assessment: “The Hair is trying to offer sex and humor, a show and momentum, violence and drama. In all of this, it fails miserably.” Timo Malmi from Ilta-Sanomat considers the film to be one of the "worst Finnish films ever" and in his assessment calls the film's “plot so confusing and tense that its progression is not even interesting, and the "alternative" fantasy ending does not make the viewing experience any easier.” In connection with the 2011 DVD release, Janne Rosenqvist from Film-o-Holic site found something positive in the film as well: “At its best, The Hair offers smooth physical black comedy spiced with jazz, but the outright obsession with experimentation is too much of a burden.”

Cast
Mikko Majanlahti as Pekka Halme
Arja Virtanen as Maria Virkola
Pauli Virtanen as Eero Melanen
Eeki Mantere as Kala Korpela
Eeva Varjonen as Marjatta Halme

See also
 Pierrot le Fou

References

External links

Karvat – eroottinen jännäriharvinaisuus 1970-luvulta at Yle Teema (in Finnish)
Miska Rantanen: "Onko tässä Suomen historian huonoin elokuva?" – Helsingin Sanomat, 2 August 2022. (in Finnish)

1974 films
1970s Finnish-language films
1970s Spanish-language films
Finnish multilingual films
Finnish crime comedy films
Finnish thriller films
Finnish erotic films
Films shot in Finland
Films shot in Spain
Films based on American novels
1974 multilingual films